Edward F. Walker (January 20, 1852 – 1918) was a minister and general superintendent in the Church of the Nazarene.

Born in Steubenville, Ohio, Walker pastored both Methodist and Presbyterian churches before joining the Church of the Nazarene in 1908. He pastored Los Angeles First and Pasadena First Nazarene churches in addition to serving as president of Olivet University from 1915 to 1916 and Pasadena University from 1917 to 1918. He was elected general superintendent in 1911, and continued in office until his death in 1918.

External links 
 1921 biographical sketch

1852 births
1918 deaths
American Nazarene ministers
Nazarene General Superintendents
People from Steubenville, Ohio
American Presbyterian ministers
Presidents of Olivet Nazarene University
Presidents of Point Loma Nazarene University